Phanomorpha striatalis is a moth in the family Crambidae. It was described by George Hampson in 1907. It is found in Australia, where it has been recorded from Western Australia.

References

Moths described in 1907
Heliothelini